Anthony Correia (born 2 May 1982 in Paramaribo) is a Dutch football manager and a retired professional footballer who played as a right back.

Football career
Between 2001 and 2016, he made more than 350 appearances for Telstar in the Dutch Eerste Divisie. He played his final match as a professional in April 2016 against Helmond Sport.

In 2017, Correia became an assistant coach of Telstar, being successively awarded with a contract extension in February 2022. Alongside, Correa coached ODIN '59 (2019−2020) and VV Katwijk (since 2020). As Katwijk head coach, Correia also won the 2021–22 Tweede Divisie title.

Honours

Managerial
 Katwijk
 Tweede Divisie: 2021–22

See also
 List of one-club men

References

External links
 Voetbal International profile 

1982 births
Living people
Sportspeople from Paramaribo
Dutch footballers
Surinamese emigrants to the Netherlands
Association football fullbacks
SC Telstar players
Eerste Divisie players
VV Katwijk managers